França is a civil parish in the municipality of Bragança, Portugal. The population in 2011 was 238, in an area of 53.71 km².

References

Parishes of Bragança, Portugal